Kolimer is a village in the municipalities of Lopare (Republika Srpska) and Tuzla, Tuzla Canton, Bosnia and Herzegovina.

Demographics 
According to the 2013 census, its population was 18, all Serbs, with none living in the Lopare part, thus 18 in Tuzla.

References

Populated places in Lopare
Populated places in Tuzla